The gender-equality paradox is the finding that various gender differences in personality and occupational choice are larger in more gender equal countries. Larger differences are found in Big Five personality traits, Dark Triad traits, self-esteem, depression, personal values, occupational and educational choices. This phenomenon is seemingly paradoxical because one would expect the differences to be reduced as countries become more gender egalitarian. 

Various explanations for the paradox have been proposed. Some scholars suggest that more stereotypes and gendered expectations in more gender equal countries are responsible and that women in less developed nations are more likely to choose STEM fields, based on the increased need for security and good pay. Others theorize that deeply rooted and intrinsic gender differences are less restrained and materialize more easily in gender equal countries.

Gender-equality paradox in STEM

Stoet and Geary (2018) study

This research originally claimed that within the study's sample, more gender equality in a country is linked with a lower proportion of women studying STEM fields. It conducted an analysis of the 2015 results (n=472,242 across 67 nations/regions) of the Programme for International Student Assessment (PISA), focusing on the results of questions based on science aptitude and attitudes. This was contrasted with the level of gender equality as defined by the Global Gender Gap Index (GGGI).

Findings 
The study had a number of primary findings. These can be summarized as follows:

 Girls performed similarly or better than boys in two out of every three countries, and were more capable of STEM tertiary education in nearly all countries examined.
Science or mathematics is much more likely to be a personal academic strength for boys than for girls
 More girls entered STEM degrees than graduated.
 The difference between both the performance of girls in PISA was inversely related to the country's GGGI.
 This gap was found to be correlated with the STEM graduation gap, showing that there is a similar gap between the number of girls and boys that enter STEM university programmes compared to those that complete their degrees in more gender-equal countries.

It's important to note that the absolute size of the gap found was not shown to be significant. Rather it is the relative relationship between the two that was found to show an effect. In other words, no relation was found between the total number of girls who entered and completed STEM degrees and the GGGI of the country. Rather, the effect was between the relative difference in number of girls vs. boys who entered and completed STEM degrees, and the GGGI of their country.

Correction to original paper and Richardson et al. (2020) 
Separate Harvard researchers were unable to recreate the data reported in the study, and after internal review at the journal, a correction was issued to the original paper. The correction outlined that the authors had created a previously undisclosed and unvalidated method to measure "propensity" of women and men to attain a higher degree in STEM, as opposed to the originally claimed measurement of "women’s share of STEM degrees". However, even incorporating the newly disclosed method, the investigating researchers could not recreate all the results presented. A follow-up paper by the researchers who discovered the discrepancy found conceptual and empirical problems with the gender-equality paradox in STEM hypothesis. In February 2020, Stoet and Geary issued a reply, as a commentary in Psychological Science, claiming that, despite their approach, the overall correlation that they had found remained the same, and restated their hypothesis that "men are more likely than women to enter STEM careers because of endogenous interest", with the hope that future studies would "help to confirm or reject such a theoretical account."

Breda, Jouini, Napp and Thebault (2020) study on economic development and gendered study choices 
In 2020, a study by Thomas Breda, Elyès Jouini, Clotilde Napp and Georgia Thebault on PISA 2012 data found that the "paradox of gender equality" could be "entirely explained" by the stereotype associating math to men being stronger in more egalitarian and developed countries.

Usage to describe personality and preference differences by gender 
The gender equality paradox has also been used to describe gender differences in personality tests and preferences in more gender equal and wealthier countries, primarily in relation to studies conducted by Falk and Hermle (2018) and by Mac Giolla and Kajonius (2018). Falk and Hermle (2018) used the 2012 Gallup World Poll that explored the preferences of around 80,000 people from 76 different countries and found that richer and more gender-equal countries had bigger gender gaps in people’s preferences. Mac Giolla and Kajonius (2018) found that women tend to rate higher than men on all five facets of personality on the IPIP‐NEO‐120 personality test and that the gap gets wider in countries that rank higher on the GGGI.

Other usage in academic sources 
The gender equality paradox has also been used to describe separate claims within the academic literature. Examples include:

 Usdansky (2011) to describe a claim that "less educated couples with less skilled occupations and less money tend to voice more enthusiasm for specialized gender roles".
 A conference paper by Klaus and Kroezen (2017) to describe the rule differences by gender in professional tennis.
 Thelwall and Mas-Bleda (2020) to describe a claim that "countries with a higher proportion of female first-authored journal articles have larger first-author gender disparities between fields". This was based on a "first-author gender comparison of 30 million articles from all 27 Scopus broad fields within the 31 countries with the most Scopus-indexed articles 2014–2018".

See also 

 Gender differences
 Perverse incentive
 Unintended consequences
 Women in STEM fields

References

Gender equality
Gender roles